Field Marshal Michael John Dawson Walker, Baron Walker of Aldringham,  (born 7 July 1944) is a retired British Army officer. Commissioned in 1966, he served in Cyprus, Northern Ireland, and in a variety of staff posts in the United Kingdom until 1984. After being given command of a battalion, he was mentioned in despatches for his service during a second tour of duty in Northern Ireland, this time in Derry, and subsequently served a tour on Gibraltar. He was promoted to brigadier, unusually having never held the rank of colonel, and took command of 20th Armoured Brigade in Germany before becoming I Corps chief of staff.

As a major general, Walker was appointed General Officer Commanding, Eastern District, before becoming Assistant Chief of the Defence Staff at the Ministry of Defence. He took command of NATO's Allied Rapid Reaction Corps (ARRC), which deployed to the Balkans in 1995, Walker becoming the first officer to command the land component of the NATO-led Implementation Force. For his service with the multi-national forces in the Balkans, he was awarded the American Legion of Merit. After relinquishing command of the ARRC, Walker spent three years as Commander in Chief, Land Command, before being appointed Chief of the General Staff—the professional head of the British Army—in 2000. In 2003, he was promoted to Chief of the Defence Staff (CDS)—the professional head of all the British Armed Forces. While CDS, Walker attracted controversy during the modernisation of the armed forces, over allegations of prisoner abuse during the Iraq War, and over comments that the media coverage of Iraq may have endangered British troops.

Walker retired in 2006 and was subsequently appointed Governor of the Royal Hospital Chelsea, a post he held until 2011. He is married and has three children.

Early and personal life
Born in Salisbury in the British colony of Southern Rhodesia (modern-day Zimbabwe) to William Hampden Dawson Walker, who was a Senior Assistant Commissioner in the British South Africa Police until 1958, and Dorothy Helena Walker (née Shiach), Walker was educated both in Southern Rhodesia and in Yorkshire, first at Milton School, Bulawayo, and then at Woodhouse Grove School, West Yorkshire. He spent 18 months teaching in a Preparatory School before joining the British Army. Walker married Victoria ("Tor", née Holme), in 1973 and the couple have three children—two sons and one daughter. He lists his interests as sailing, shooting, tennis, skiing and golf.

Early military career
After attending the Royal Military Academy Sandhurst, Walker was commissioned into the Royal Anglian Regiment as a second lieutenant on 29 July 1966. He served as a platoon commander with the 1st Battalion and was promoted to lieutenant on 29 January 1968. In 1969 he was posted to Cyprus for a two-year tour, and served in Northern Ireland during The Troubles, before attending the Staff College, Camberley. He was promoted to captain on 29 July 1972.

After serving in a staff position at the Ministry of Defence (MoD), Walker was promoted to major at the end of 1976, and rejoined 1st Battalion, to become a company commander, based in Tidworth, Wiltshire. In 1979, he took up another staff post at the MoD, after which he was promoted to lieutenant colonel in 1982. Until 1985, he served as Military Assistant (MA) to the Chief of the General Staff. He was appointed an Officer of the Order of the British Empire (OBE) in the New Year Honours List in December 1984.

In command of the 1st Battalion from 1985 to 1987, Walker served another tour in Northern Ireland, this time in Derry, and later a tour on Gibraltar. He was mentioned in despatches in 1987 "in recognition of gallant and distinguished service" in Northern Ireland. Unusually, Walker was promoted directly to brigadier at the end of 1987, without having held the rank of colonel. He took command of 20th Armoured Brigade, based in Germany, from 1987 to 1989, before holding the post of Chief of Staff, I Corps between 1989 and 1991.

High command

Walker attained general officer status with promotion to acting major general in 1991 and took command of North East District and 2nd Infantry Division. Having served in the Gulf War, he was promoted to Commander of the Order of the British Empire (CBE) later in 1991. He was granted the substantive rank of major general on 2 December 1991, with seniority from 14 February 1991, going on to serve as General Officer Commanding of the Eastern District and then as Assistant Chief of the General Staff from 11 December 1992 to 3 October 1994.

On 8 December 1994, Walker was appointed commander of NATO's Allied Rapid Reaction Corps (ARRC), which had its headquarters in Rheindahlen, Germany, and promoted to acting lieutenant general. He was granted the substantive rank of lieutenant general on 15 March 1995, and knighted in the 1995 Queen's Birthday Honours when he was appointed a Knight Commander of the Order of the Bath. Under Walker's command, the ARRC deployed to the Balkans in December 1995. There, he became the first commander of the land component of the NATO-led Implementation Force (IFOR), until his return to the UK in November 1996.

His IFOR command in Bosnia was indirectly criticised by Richard Holbrooke for his refusal to use his authority to also perform nonmilitary implementation tasks, including arresting indicted war criminals:

He was appointed a Companion of the Order of St Michael and St George at the end of 1996.

Succeeded as COMARRC by Sir Mike Jackson, Walker was promoted to acting general and appointed Commander in Chief, Land Command on 27 January 1997. He was granted the substantive rank of general on 2 April 1997. In recognition of his service with IFOR between 1995 and 1996, Walker was awarded the American Legion of Merit (Degree of Commander), and granted unrestricted permission to wear the decoration, in May 1997. In September 1997, he was appointed Aide-de-Camp General (ADC Gen) to Queen Elizabeth II, succeeding General Sir Michael Rose, until he in turn was succeeded by General Sir Richard Dannatt. He was promoted to Knight Grand Cross of the Order of the Bath in the New Year Honours List at the end of 1999.

Having served just over three years as Commander-in-Chief, Walker was appointed Chief of the General Staff (CGS)—the professional head of the British Army—on 17 April 2000, taking over from General Sir Roger Wheeler. He remained CGS for three years, after which he was promoted to Chief of the Defence Staff (CDS)—the professional head of all the British Armed Forces—on 2 May 2003, succeeding Admiral Sir Michael Boyce (later Lord Boyce). As CDS, Walker criticised some of the media coverage of British deployments in Iraq. In particular, he claimed that attacks on the Black Watch were "enhanced" due to news reports on their location. He went on to say that "[as a result of the media coverage], there could well have been a response by those who wished us ill to go and meet us with something like a bomb". His comments were rejected by a spokesman for the National Union of Journalists, who retaliated "When generals turn around and start blaming reporters for their own mistakes, it is a sign they aren't doing their own jobs properly". However, the MoD explained that speculation in the press about the timing and movement of military units can put people in danger and editors were "urged to consider the difficulties reports could cause to troops on the ground." Also in 2004, Walker, along with General Sir Mike Jackson, then Chief of the General Staff, attracted controversy over reforms of the armed forces, which included the amalgamation of several army regiments to form larger regiments, leading to the loss of historic names.

In an interview with the BBC in October 2005, Walker suggested that the army's recruitment had been adversely affected by the Iraq War. He also commented on the war in Afghanistan, on which he said "There's a lot of work to be done, of which the military is only a very small part. Ten years, 15 years, long-term. This is not going to be solved in a short term". In the same month, he gave an interview for The Sunday Times, in which he said that soldiers' morale had been damaged by the unpopularity of the war among the British public. Later in 2005, Walker was instrumental in drawing up new procedures for the treatment of British service personnel accused of abusing Iraqi prisoners, following claims that the army had abandoned those soldiers charged in connection with the prisoner abuses. In February 2006, Walker headed up a military delegation to Bulgaria to discuss military cooperation between the British and Bulgarian governments.

Walker gave evidence to the Iraq Inquiry on 1 February 2010, in which he spoke about funding for the invasion of Iraq and subsequent planning.

Honorary roles
Lord Walker has held a variety of honorary and ceremonial roles in different regiments. He was granted the honorary titles of Colonel Commandant and Deputy Colonel of Queen's Division (of which the Royal Anglian Regiment is part) in April 1992 and Honorary Colonel, 3rd Battalion Duke of Wellington's Regiment (West Riding) (Yorkshire Volunteers), in October 1993, which he relinquished on 30 June 1999. In 1994, he succeeded General Sir John Learmont as Colonel Commandant of the Army Air Corps and held the title until April 2004, when he was relieved by then Lieutenant General Sir Richard Dannatt (later General Lord Dannatt). In 1997, he was appointed honorary Colonel, The Royal Anglian Regiment, in succession to Major General Patrick Stone, and was himself succeeded as Deputy Colonel by Brigadier John Sutherell. Sutherell, then a major general, went on to succeed Walker as Honorary Colonel in February 2000.

Retirement
Walker relinquished his appointment as Chief of the Defence Staff in April 2006 and retired from the Army, succeeded as CDS by Air Chief Marshal Jock Stirrup. In September 2006, Walker was appointed Governor of the Royal Hospital Chelsea, holding the post until February 2011 when he resigned suddenly. On 24 November 2006, it was announced that he would receive a life peerage, and, on 19 December, he was created Baron Walker of Aldringham, of Aldringham in the county of Suffolk, sitting in the House of Lords as a crossbencher. He was given the ceremonial appointment of Deputy Lieutenant of Greater London in 2007. Walker was appointed as an honorary field marshal in the Queen's 2014 Birthday Honours. He serves as the Patron of the British South Africa Police Trust.

Arms

References

Sources

 

|-

|-

|-

|-

|-

|-

British field marshals
Commanders of the Order of the British Empire
1944 births
Zimbabwean people of British descent
White Rhodesian people
People from Harare
Zimbabwean emigrants to the United Kingdom
Royal Anglian Regiment officers
Crossbench life peers
Living people
British Army personnel of the Gulf War
Foreign recipients of the Legion of Merit
Knights Grand Cross of the Order of the Bath
Companions of the Order of St Michael and St George
Deputy Lieutenants of Greater London
Commanders of the Legion of Merit
People educated at Woodhouse Grove School
Chiefs of the General Staff (United Kingdom)
Chiefs of the Defence Staff (United Kingdom)
Graduates of the Royal Military Academy Sandhurst
British military personnel of The Troubles (Northern Ireland)
Graduates of the Staff College, Camberley
Life peers created by Elizabeth II